The 2nd Parliament of Lower Canada was in session from January 24, 1797, to June 4, 1800. Elections to the Legislative Assembly in Lower Canada had been held in June 1796. All sessions were held at Quebec City.

References

External links 
  Assemblée nationale du Québec (French)
Journals of the House of Assembly of Lower Canada ..., John Neilson (1797)

02
1797 establishments in Lower Canada
1800 disestablishments in Lower Canada